The 2007 Banka Koper Slovenia Open was a tennis tournament played on outdoor hard courts. It was the 3rd edition of the Banka Koper Slovenia Open, and was part of the WTA Tier IV tournaments of the 2007 WTA Tour. It was held in Portorož, Slovenia, from September 17 through September 23, 2007.

Points and prize money

Point distribution

Prize money

* per team

Singles main-draw entrants

Seeds

Other entrants 

The following players received wildcards into the singles main draw:
  Polona Hercog
  Andreja Klepač
  Maša Zec Peškirič

The following players received entry from the qualifying draw:
  Nika Ožegović
  Magdaléna Rybáriková 
  Nathalie Viérin
  Ana Vrljić

The following players received entries as lucky losers:
  Renata Voráčová

Retirements
  Alona Bondarenko
  Ahsha Rolle (right knee sprain)
  Alina Jidkova (dizziness)
  Nicole Vaidišová (right wrist injury)

Doubles main-draw entrants

Seeds

Other entrants 
The following pairs received wildcards into the doubles main draw:
  Jasmina Kajtazovič /  Tina Obrež

Retirements 

  Ivana Lisjak ''(Right elbow injury)

Champions

Singles 

 Tatiana Golovin def.  Katarina Srebotnik, 2–6, 6–4, 6–4

Doubles 

 Lucie Hradecká /  Renata Voráčová def.  Andreja Klepač /  Elena Likhovtseva, 5–7, 6–4, 10–7

References

External links 

Singles and Doubles Main Draw

Banka Koper Slovenia Open
Banka Koper Slovenia Open
2007 in Slovenian tennis